Burkholderia dolosa is a species of bacteria. It is a member of the Burkholderia cepacia complex.  This particular strain is highly drug resistant and found primarily in immunocompromised patients.  It was originally identified in several cystic fibrosis patients at Boston Children's Hospital, and is believed to exist in only three hospitals worldwide; Boston, Texas, and England.

References

External links

Type strain of Burkholderia dolosa at BacDive -  the Bacterial Diversity Metadatabase

Burkholderiaceae
Bacteria described in 2004